The Pelton River is a  tributary of the Slate River in Gogebic County on the Upper Peninsula of Michigan in the United States. Via the Slate River, its water flows to Lake Gogebic, which feeds the West Branch Ontonagon River, flowing to the Ontonagon River and ultimately to Lake Superior.

See also
List of rivers of Michigan

References

Michigan  Streamflow Data from the USGS

Rivers of Michigan
Rivers of Gogebic County, Michigan
Tributaries of Lake Superior